Robert "Bob" Osserman (December 19, 1926 – November 30, 2011) was an American mathematician who worked in geometry. He is specially remembered for his work on the theory of minimal surfaces.

Raised in Bronx, he went to Bronx High School of Science (diploma, 1942) and New York University. He earned a Ph.D. in 1955 from Harvard University with the thesis Contributions to the Problem of Type (on Riemann surfaces) supervised by Lars Ahlfors.

He joined Stanford University in 1955.  He joined the Mathematical Sciences Research Institute in 1990.
He  worked on geometric function theory, differential geometry, the two integrated in a theory of minimal surfaces, isoperimetric inequality, and other issues in the areas of astronomy, geometry, cartography and complex function theory.

Osserman was the head of mathematics at Office of Naval Research, a Fulbright Lecturer at the University of Paris and Guggenheim Fellow at the University of Warwick. He edited numerous books and promoted mathematics, such as in interviews with celebrities  Steve Martin and Alan Alda.

He was an invited speaker at the International Congress of Mathematicians (ICM) of 1978 in Helsinki.

He received the Lester R. Ford Award (1980) of the Mathematical Association of America for his popular science writings.

H. Blaine Lawson, David Allen Hoffman and Michael Gage were Ph.D. students of his.

Robert Osserman died on Wednesday, November 30, 2011 at his home.

Mathematical contributions

The Keller–Osserman problem
Osserman's most widely cited research article, published in 1957, dealt with the partial differential equation

As a particular instance of his more general result:

Osserman's method was to construct special solutions of the PDE which would facilitate application of the maximum principle. In particular, he showed that for any real number  there exists a rotationally symmetric solution on some ball which takes the value  at the center and diverges to infinity near the boundary.

The same problem was independently considered by Joseph Keller, who was drawn to it for applications in electrohydrodynamics. Osserman's motivation was from differential geometry, with the observation that the scalar curvature of the Riemannian metric  on the plane is given by

An application of Osserman's non-existence theorem then shows:

By a different maximum principle-based method, Shiu-Yuen Cheng and Shing-Tung Yau generalized the Keller–Osserman non-existence result, in part by a generalization to the setting of a Riemannian manifold. This was, in turn, an important piece of one of their resolutions of the Calabi–Jörgens problem on rigidity of affine hyperspheres with nonnegative mean curvature.

Non-existence for the minimal surface system in higher codimension
In collaboration with his former student H. Blaine Lawson, Osserman studied the minimal surface problem in the case that the codimension is larger than one. They considered the case of a graphical minimal submanifold of euclidean space. Their conclusion was that most of the analytical properties which hold in the codimension-one case fail to extend. Solutions to the boundary value problem may exist and fail to be unique, or in other situations may simply fail to exist. Such submanifolds (given as graphs) might not even solve the Plateau problem, as they automatically must in the case of graphical hypersurfaces of Euclidean space.

Their results pointed to the deep analytical difficulty of general elliptic systems and of the minimal submanifold problem in particular. Many of these issues have still failed to be fully understood, despite their great significance in the theory of calibrated geometry and the Strominger–Yau–Zaslow conjecture.

Books
Two-Dimensional Calculus (Harcourt, Brace & World, 1968; Krieger, 1977; Dover Publications, Inc, 2011)  ;  ; 
A Survey of Minimal Surfaces (1969, 1986)
Poetry of the Universe: A Mathematical Exploration of the Cosmos (Random House, 1995)

Awards
John Simon Guggenheim Memorial Foundation fellow (1976)
Lester R. Ford Award (1980)
2003 Joint Policy Board for Mathematics Communications Award.

Topics named after Robert Osserman
Chern–Osserman inequality
Osserman conjecture in Riemannian geometry
Osserman manifolds
Osserman's theorem

Selected research papers

References

1926 births
2011 deaths
20th-century American mathematicians
21st-century American mathematicians
New York University alumni
Harvard University alumni
Stanford University Department of Mathematics faculty
Differential geometers
American textbook writers